Zhang He (born December 1950) is a retired Chinese politician formerly served as vice-governor of Hebei between 2006 and 2011. As of April 2020 he was under investigation by the Communist Party's anti-corruption agency. He is the ninth provincial and ministerial level official investigated in Hebei province after the 18th National Congress of the Chinese Communist Party.

Early life and education
Zhang was born in Qianxi County, Hebei, in December 1950, one year and two months after the establishment of the Communist State. During the Cultural Revolution, he worked in his home-county. In August 1973, he was accepted to Hebei Normal University, where he majored in mathematics.

Career
After graduating in August 1976, he became an official in the Communist Youth League of Qianxi County. In April 1978, he was transferred to Tangshan, where he successively served as a section member, secretary-general of Tangshan government, assistant mayor, vice-mayor, acting mayor, mayor, and Party secretary. In March 2005, he became a member of the CCP Hebei Provincial Committee. In October 2006 he was promoted to become vice-governor of Hebei, a position he held until his retirement in January 2011. Then he was appointed deputy Party Group secretary of the CCP Hebei Provincial Committee.

Downfall
On April 29, he was put under investigation for alleged "serious violations of discipline and laws" by the Central Commission for Discipline Inspection (CCDI), the party's internal disciplinary body, and the National Supervisory Commission, the highest anti-corruption agency of China. On July 28, 2020, he was expelled from the Chinese Communist Party over serious violations of Party discipline and laws. The anti-corruption agency said in a statement that "Zhang lost his ideals and convictions and was disloyal and dishonest to the Party, he had violated the eight-point frugality code on Party and government conduct by visiting private clubs and attending banquets, and he was also found to have appointed officials against Party regulations, accepted gifts and money, and allowed relatives to seek personal gains by taking advantage of his position."  He was demoted to the fourth level investigator position.

References

1950 births
Politicians from Tangshan
Living people
Hebei Normal University alumni
People's Republic of China politicians from Hebei
Chinese Communist Party politicians from Hebei